Errol Thompson may refer to:

Errol Thompson (audio engineer) (1948–2004), record producer and audio engineer
Errol Thompson (ice hockey) (born 1950), retired ice hockey winger

See also
The Kemist, also known as Errol Thompson, Jamaican dj